Mitochondrial GTPase 1 is an enzyme that in humans is encoded by the MTG1 gene.

References

Further reading